HMS San Josef was a 114-gun first-rate ship of the line of the Royal Navy. Originally built at Ferrol in Galicia for the Spanish Navy in 1782–83, she was captured from the Spanish Navy at the Battle of Cape St Vincent on 14 February 1797 (when she was still named in Spanish San José). In 1809 she served as the flagship of Admiral John Thomas Duckworth.

Battle of Cape St Vincent 
The San José was among the Spanish fleet during the battle, during which HMS Captain, under the command of Captain Horatio Nelson came out of the line to attack the San Nicolás. After exchanging fire, Nelson led his forces aboard the San Nicolás. While the English were fighting their way aboard the San José continued to fire upon the Captain and the San Nicolás. The San José then fell upon the San Nicolás and their rigging became tangled. Trapped, the men from the San José continued to fire on the British boarding parties with muskets and pistols. Nelson then took his men from the decks of the San Nicolás aboard the San José, forcing the Spanish to surrender, with their Admiral badly injured. The San José and the San Nicolás, both captured by Nelson, were two of the four ships captured during the battle. After their capture they were renamed HMS San Josef and HMS San Nicolas respectively. The feat of using one enemy vessel as a 'stepping stone' to capture another was afterwards known in the Royal Navy as "Nelson's patent bridge for boarding first rates".

Later career 
From 1839 San Josef was used as a gunnery training ship. From 10 August 1841 she was commanded by Captain Joseph Needham Tayler, serving as a guard ship at Devonport (established gunnery school). Other captains who served in her include: Captain Frederick William Burgoyne, while serving as the flagship of Samuel Pym, Plymouth; Captain Henry John Leeke; and Captain Thomas Maitland, as the flagship of Admiral William Hall Gage, Devonport. She was broken up a Devonport in May 1849.

Some small pieces of the San Josef still survive to this day. One is in the form of part of a wooden gun carriage; called a Quoin. This quoin can be found among the Valhalla figurehead collection in Tresco Abbey Gardens in the Isles of Scilly. Another is a carved Triumph of Arms from the stern rail sold at Bonhams in London in October 2014. Parts of the ship were used in the re-building of St Nicholas' Church, West Looe in 1852.

Legacy
San Josef Mountain on the South Coast of British Columbia, on the south side of Estero Basin on Frederick Arm to the west of the mouth of Bute Inlet, was named in 1864 by Captain Pender for the San Josef, while Departure Bay and Nanaimo Harbour at the city of Nanaimo were originally named (in 1791) the Bocas de Winthuysen after Rear-Admiral Don Francisco Xavier Winthuysen. San Josef Bay in Cape Scott Provincial Park at the north end of Vancouver Island is also named after this ship.

References 

 Sconce, Robert Clement, Life and Letters of R. C. Sconce, formerly Secretary to Admiral Sir John Duckworth, Compiled by Sarah S. Bunbury. in two volumes, Cox & Wyman, London, 1861

External links

Ships of the line of the Spanish Navy
Ships of the line of the Royal Navy
1783 ships
Captured ships